Conestoga station is located beside the King Street entrance on the westerly side of Conestoga Mall in Waterloo, Ontario. This facility operates as a major transit terminal for Grand River Transit (GRT) buses, with all of the routes that it serves terminating here. Perth County Connect buses, serving Stratford, Perth County and London, also serve the station via a stop on King Street.

Conestoga is also the northern terminus of the Region of Waterloo's Ion rapid transit system, which opened on June 21, 2019.

Access to the LRT platforms is primarily from the north, where both a stairway and ramp lead down to the bus terminal; the King Street sidewalk can also be reached. Sidewalk access is also available from the south end of the platforms.

The station's feature walls consist of ceramic tiles in a pattern of red, orange, blue, teal, and yellow.

The station features the artwork Continuum by Catherine Paleczny about the continuum of communities and the progression of time.

Bus services

Grand River Transit
 iXpress 201 Fischer–Hallman
 iXpress 202 University 
 Route 6 Bridge–Courtland 
 Route 7 King 
 Route 9 Lakeshore
 Route 14 Bathurst
 Route 21 Elmira
 Route 29 Keats–University 
 Route 31 Columbia

Perth County Connect
 Route 1 Listowel
 Route 2 St. Mary's

References

External links

 

Ion light rail stations
Bus stations in Waterloo, Ontario
Railway stations in Waterloo, Ontario
1996 establishments in Ontario
2019 establishments in Ontario
Railway stations opened in 2019